Soğuksu is a village in the Kestel district of Bursa Province in Turkey.

References

Villages in Kestel District